The Ponte da Ribeira de Meimoa is a medieval bridge that crosses the Ribeira de Meimoa, in the civil parish of Meimoa, municipality of Penamacor in Portuguese district of Castelo Branco.

History
The bridge was constructed between 14th and 16th century, over a pre-existing structure that was constructed during the Roman epoch.  The structure was totally reconstructed during the Reconquista, and integrated into the secondary military line that connected Salgueiro to Meimoa, winding through the Via Lata. Legend suggests that a Roman bridge existed on the site, and was destroyed during the Reconquista, which was part of the line connecting Mérida to Viseu, and that crossed the district of Castelo Branco, the settlements of Idanha-a-Velha, Medelim, Bemposta, Mata, Torre dos Namorados, Meimoa and Capinha.

In 1607, a charter by King Philip II placed the construction of the bridge in the hands of Gonçalo Sanches, a stonemason and resident of Castelo Branco, for 4750 cruzados (collected from payments from the cities of Guarda, Viseu, Lamego, Porto, Guimarães, Viana do Castelo and Torre de Moncorvo.

In the Memórias Paroquiais of 1758, the bridge was described (by vicar Lourenço Fernandes de Nazaré) as being constructed by masonry and connected the Beira Alta to Beira Baixa.

On 31 March 1952, the bridge was reconstructed (labelled along the talhamares), but a new project occurred the following year (3 November 1955) and again on 8 January 1996, at which time a guardrail was reconstruction.

Architecture
The bridge is situated on the urban periphery, linking the relatively flat lowlands of the Ribeira de Meimoa, that parallel the settlement of Meimoa, near cement ruins and an interrupted roadway. The zone is part of a protected/conservation area.

References

Notes

Sources

See also
List of bridges in Portugal

Bridges in Castelo Branco District